Saros cycle series 117 for solar eclipses occurs at the Moon's ascending node, repeating every 18 years, 11 days, containing 71 events. The first eclipse in this series was on June 24, 792 AD. The final eclipse in this series will be on August 3, 2054. All eclipses in this series occurs at the Moon's ascending node.

This solar saros is linked to Lunar Saros 110.

Umbral eclipses
Umbral eclipses (annular, total and hybrid) can be further classified as either: 1) Central (two limits), 2) Central (one limit) or 3) Non-Central (one limit). The statistical distribution of these classes in Saros series 117 appears in the following table.

Events

References 
 http://eclipse.gsfc.nasa.gov/SEsaros/SEsaros117.html

External links
Saros cycle 117 - Information and visualization

Solar saros series